Robert John Richardson (born December 22, 1992), better known by his stage name Bobby Raps, is an American rapper, singer, songwriter, and record producer. He has been a member of Thestand4rd, Audio Perm, and Dequexatron X000.

Early life
Bobby Raps was born Robert John Richardson on December 22, 1992 in Saint Paul, Minnesota. While in high school, he started rapping and producing beats. He graduated from Saint Paul Central High School.

Career
In 2011, Bobby Raps released his debut mixtape, Gimme Daps. In 2015, he released a collaborative EP with Corbin, titled Couch Potato. Entirely produced by Bobby Raps, it features a guest appearance from Izell Pyramid. City Pages described it as "a thoroughly haunting dose of ethereal hip-hop that sounds like if James Blake cut a record with Earl Sweatshirt." The opening song of the EP, titled "Welcome to the Hell Zone", was included on Complexs "Best Songs of the Week" list. The duo's live performances have received favorable reviews from City Pages and Billboard.

In 2016, Bobby Raps contributed to Watch the Stove, a viral mixtape campaign by Hamburger Helper. He, alongside Dequexatron X000 collaborator DJ Tiiiiiiiiiip, featured on the opening track of the album.

In 2017, he released his major-label debut, Mark, on Republic Records. It includes production from Shlohmo and D33J. Complex called it "[Bobby Raps'] strongest body of work to date."

Discography

Studio albums
 Thestand4rd (2014) 
 Mark (2017)
 not scared enough (2021)

Mixtapes
 Gimme Daps (2011)
 Wicked City (2015) 
 Weird Lil World (2018)
 Believe the Lie (Dir.by Alex howard)(2020)

EPs
 Couch Potato (2015)

References

External links
 
 

1992 births
Living people
Musicians from Saint Paul, Minnesota
Rappers from Minnesota
American male rappers
21st-century American rappers
Singers from Minnesota
American hip hop singers
21st-century American singers
Record producers from Minnesota
American hip hop record producers
21st-century American male singers